WMIB (103.5 FM)  is an urban contemporary radio station in South Florida, United States. It is licensed to Fort Lauderdale, Florida, but it also serves Miami and the Miami metropolitan area. The station is owned by iHeartMedia and the broadcast license is held by Clear Channel Broadcast Licenses, Inc. Its studios are located in Miramar and the transmitter site is in Miami Gardens. WMIB competes with WEDR. WMIB broadcasts with 100,000 watts effective radiated power and 1,007 feet height above average terrain from the Guy Gannett broadcasting tower in Miami. Other stations on the tower are WAXY-FM, WHYI-FM, WMXJ, WHQT-FM, WMIA-FM, WFLC, WFEZ, WEDR, and WMGE.

WMIB is licensed by the FCC to broadcast in the HD Radio (hybrid) format.

History
The station started as WWIL-FM in 1959. Until 1972, and after a call letter change to WSRF-FM in 1968, the station carried a beautiful music format. In 1972, the station flipped to an album rock format, branded as WSHE. Following its purchase by Paxson Communications in April 1996, WSHE dismissed all airstaff, dropped the rock format after 24 years, and began a 36-hour stunt loop of playing "Changes" by David Bowie, "Change" by Candlebox, and "It's the End of the World as We Know It (And I Feel Fine)" by R.E.M., while promoting a change to come at 1:03 p.m. on May 2. At that time, the station adopted a Modern AC format, first as "The New 103.5", then as "Planet Radio" with new callsign WPLL. The first song as "The New 103.5"
was "Steppin' Out" by Joe Jackson.  Another format change by the station's next and current owner, iHeartMedia (then called Clear Channel Communications), this time to the "Jammin' Oldies" format, resulted in another call letter/branding change to WMGE, "Mega 103.5", at Midnight on June 30, 1999.

The station flipped to WMIB on December 31, 2002. For four years, WMIB was an Urban Contemporary-formatted station, with a stronger emphasis on hip hop.  It was home to The Doug Banks Morning Show from its launch until late 2005, when it was replaced by The Star And Buc Wild Morning Show, which was cancelled in spring 2006.

On October 5, 2006, WMIB modified its urban format to serve an adult audience, and added the nationally syndicated Steve Harvey Morning Show. On air personality Prince Markie Dee, from the group The Fat Boys, hosted the afternoon drive show.  After two years as Urban AC, WMIB returned to Urban Contemporary in 2008.

On May 13, 2010, airstaffers at WMIB began posting on their Twitter pages that a format change was coming. Sources were reporting that WMIB would either flip to Talk or Spanish the following day. On May 14, at Noon, after playing "Get Me Home" by Foxy Brown, the station flipped to Spanish Adult Contemporary as "103.5 SuperX". The first song as "SuperX" was "Where Do You Go" by No Mercy.

On May 23, 2012, WMIB fired its on-air staff. The next day, at 5 a.m., after playing Marc Anthony's "Me Haces Falta", WMIB flipped to adult hits as "She 103-5", returning the "She" branding to the frequency for the first time in 16 years. The first song on "She" was She's a Beauty by The Tubes. On May 31, WMIB changed their call letters to WSHE-FM. During its time as "She", the station leaned towards modern rock. On April 15, 2013, the station re-branded as "Variety 103-5".

On October 11, 2013, at 11 a.m., after playing "Waterfalls" by TLC, the station stunted for an hour with Dance music as "Evolution 103.5", a format carried by its sister station W228BY, before flipping back to Urban at Noon and returning to the "103.5 The Beat" moniker, this time with a hip-hop intensive playlist. The first song after the relaunch was Waka Flocka Flame's freestyle version of "U.O.E.N.O." by Rocko. On October 24, 2013, WSHE changed their call letters back to WMIB.  As of November 2013, it became the affiliate of The Breakfast Club, based from sister station WWPR-FM in New York.

HD Radio
WMIB-HD2 currently airs a Russian-language format known as "DaNu Radio." The format also airs on sister WWPR-HD2 in New York.

On May 25, 2017 at 4 p.m., WMIB signed on an HD3 sub-channel, and began airing a classic hip hop format, branded as "PK's Throwback 105.5" (simulcasting on translator W288DD FM 105.5), the "PK" standing for Papa Keith, afternoon host on WMIB and the voiceover of the new station. The first song on "Throwback" was "It's Your Birthday" by Miami native Luke.

References

External links

DaNu Radio (HD2)

MIB
Urban contemporary radio stations in the United States
Radio stations established in 1959
IHeartMedia radio stations
1959 establishments in Florida